Mayfield is an unincorporated community in Charlotte County, New Brunswick.

History

Notable people

See also
List of communities in New Brunswick

References

Communities in Charlotte County, New Brunswick